Robert Foster (born January 1, 1947) is an American former businessman and politician who served as the mayor of Long Beach, California. He was elected in a runoff election in 2006. Prior to serving as mayor, Foster climbed the ranks of Southern California Edison, becoming president in 2002.  Foster was appointed to the California State University Board of Trustees in 1998 by Governor Pete Wilson. He had previously worked for the California State Senate as a consultant on state energy policy.

Early life

Foster was born and raised in Brooklyn, New York. He attended San Jose State University for his undergraduate studies, majoring in public administration.  During his college years, he operated a carpet-laying business. After graduating, he began working for the California State Senate while he began PhD coursework in political science at the University of California, Davis.  Later, Foster worked for the Senate Energy Committee, where he helped develop legislation that created statewide energy efficiency standards.  He also taught for one semester as the "Leader-in-Residence" in the Department of Political Science at San Jose State University.

Election

Noting his experience working in the private and public sectors, Foster campaigned on a platform that called for an end to the city's mounting deficit. He also advocated adding 100 new police officers to the streets of Long Beach and reducing traffic and pollution permeating from the Port of Long Beach. Foster won the June 6, 2006, election with 57.2% of the vote.

Personal life
Foster and his wife, Nancy, are long-time residents of Long Beach.  They have two grown sons, and three grandchildren.

References

External links
 www.MayorBobFoster.com

Mayors of Long Beach, California
San Jose State University alumni
University of California, Davis alumni
San Jose State University faculty
Living people
1947 births
California Democrats
Politicians from Brooklyn